Crisscross Crags are an irregularly shaped system of crags with arms extending in four directions, rising to  east of Rum Cove in James Ross Island. The feature was named descriptively by the UK Antarctic Place-Names Committee in 1987.

References
 

Cliffs of James Ross Island